Jenifer Yésica Martínez Fernández (Córdoba, Spain, October 13, 1985),  known professionally as India Martínez, is a Spanish flamenco and pop singer. Her artistic name was made out by the first manager she had at the age of 17, when she signed her first record contract. Her first contact with flamenco was through the dance classes she received from Nieves Camacho in Córdoba at the age of 5. When she was 11 years old, she moved with her parents to Puerto de Roquetas de Mar (Almería), where a year later she began to sing and also started to be called "La Niña del Puerto".

She was nominated to Latin Grammy Award for Best New Artist during Latin Grammy Awards of 2009. She won Premio Cadena Dial 2012 award for the album Trece Verdades certified gold. She is signed to Sony Music Entertainment. She also won, in 2015, the Goya for the song of the Spanish film El Niño.

Career
Her first performance was in 1998 in the television program "Veo, Veo", presented by Teresa Rabal, where she was one of the finalists. In 2000 she won a prize as a finalist and the special prize for promising young performer in a contest of this town about Spanish songs. In 2001, as a consequence of her participation in a contest of tarantos and tarantas and in the I Contest of Flamenco Between Quejíos and Pitas celebrated in San José (Almería), she obtained the prize for best performance, the special prize of the audience and a scholarship from the Cristina Heeren foundation to learn flamenco in Seville. The following year she received an invitation to perform at the IV Encuentro de Peñas Flamencas de Almería, which was held at the Hotel Playadulce in Roquetas de Mar together with Triana Pura, and at the II Noche Flamenca in Roquetas de Mar.

In 2001, she attended the tribute to Fosforito and José Sorroche celebrated in the restaurant La Juaida as a guest artist and obtained the second prize in the Contest of Trilleros organized by Peña Antonio de Torres de la Cañada. Despite her youth and her short career, Jenifer has been claimed during the year 2002 in party halls, clubs and events of some relevance. She also carried out solo performances in Almería pubs, in the Villaespesa Library and in peña El Palangre de Roquetas de Mar. In the same way, she has intervened in the Easter Proclamation held at the Apolo Theater, in the election of Mister Almería held in the Llanos de Vicar, in recitals held at the Library of Murcia on several occasions and, during her stay at the Cristina Heeren Foundation in Seville at the festival held at La Alameda, where she sings for dancing for the first time. This young cantaora that presents a great projection enjoys a clean, bright and refined voice. Her mastery of the compass and her good taste make a very good impression on those who listen to her. To be highlighted are her interpretations by bulerías, granaínas and tientos, although she also excels at the rest of the styles.

In 2003 she signed a contract with "La Voz del Sur", which released her first album "Azulejos de Lunares" in 2004. This first album contained performances with several musical modifications of the classic boleros and tangos by José María Cortina.

In 2009 she was nominated at the Latin Grammy Awards in the category of new best artist. She won three Cadena Dial awards: the first in 2011 for her album "Trece Verdades", the second in 2013, and the third in 2017 for "Te Cuento un Secreto ". In 2015 she won the Goya for the best song for the movie "El Niño", directed by Daniel Monzón. Besides this, she has collaborated with artists such as David Bisbal, Paulo Gonzo, Pitingo, Pablo Alborán, Vanesa Martín and La Oreja de Van Gogh, among others. Finally, on February 28, 2017 she was awarded the Medal of Andalusia.

Her second album, called “Despertar” came out in 2009. In “Despertar” she fuses all flamenco styles and thanks to it she was nominated for Best New Artist at the Latin Grammy Awards that same year. In this album the singer remembers her deceased grandfather and pays tribute to him: The memory of her grandfather can be heard in two songs from her second álbum. Specifically, the singer covers Antonio Molina's song, Adiós a España, because he liked it very much and she names him in La Voz de un Marinero. This album was also nominated for Best Production.

In 2011 she released her third album "Trece Verdades": with the song Vencer al amor, the first single of this new album, India Martínez caused a profound impact; She pushed the song to become one of the three best-selling songs in Spain and Golden Record. What is more, her album remains for 15 weeks in a row in the high places of the best-selling list in Spain. From this album it’s also critical to emphasize the song 90 Minutos and its video clip, directed by Charly Prada, due to its great sense of the aesthetic. A year later, in 2012, the album "Otras Verdades" ("Other Truths") comes on to the market with her own versions of songs by artists known as Luis Fonsi or Camila.

This last has also been recognized as a gold record and was also nominated in the Latin Grammys in the category of best traditional vocal pop album. In 2013 she released his penultimate album "Camino de la Buena Suerte", which once again managed to become a gold record. In 2014, her latest release "Dual" (platinum record), compiled duets with national and international artists such as David Bisbal with Olvidé Respirar, Enrique Iglesias with Loco, and Abel Pintos with Corazón Hambriento.

In 2014 one of the most important concerts of her career took place at the Palacio de los Deportes in Madrid and she started her sixth tour to promote her album of duets, “Dual”.

In 2016 she released her seventh album called "Te Cuento un Secreto", which reached the number 1 of the best selling albums in Spain in its first week. In "Te Cuento un Secreto" she makes a new collaboration with the singer Prince Royce, with whom she sings Gris.

Discography

Albums

Singles

References

External links
Official website

1985 births
Living people
Singers from Andalusia
People from Córdoba, Spain
21st-century Spanish singers
21st-century Spanish women singers
Women in Latin music